Wills & Burke (also known as The Wacky World of Wills & Burke and Wills & Burke: The Untold Story) is a 1985 Australian black comedy film about the Burke and Wills expedition. It opened a week before Burke & Wills, a serious drama about the expedition.

Plot
In 1860, Robert O'Hara Burke and William John Wills are chosen to explore the Australian continent from south to north and back again. Just before the expedition departs, Burke proposes to young actress Julia Matthews, who has trouble remembering who he is. John Macadam tries to sustain public interest by staging a musical play about the expedition. Julia demands the lead role and grows a beard to prove she can play Burke. The play opens around the time Burke and Wills die in the desert. John King survives the expedition and is found by a search party in 1861.

Cast
 Garry McDonald as Robert O'Hara Burke
 Kym Gyngell as William John Wills
 Nicole Kidman as Julia Matthews
 Peter Collingwood as Sir William Stawell (Coincidentally, Collingwood also appeared in the drama Burke & Wills, which this film mocks. Collingwood portrayed Dr. William Wills, William John Wills' father.)
 Mark Little as John King
 Jonathan Hardy as John Macadam

Production
Philip Dalkin first wrote the story as a stage play, which Bob Weis read in 1978. He enjoyed it and at one stage thought of making it as a television miniseries before deciding on turning it into a feature film. It was shot over six weeks in and around Melbourne on a budget of $1.7 million.

Release
The film was not a success at the box office.

References

External links
 Wills and Burke at Burkeandwills.net.au
 
 Wills and Burke at Oz Movies

1985 films
Australian black comedy films
Films set in colonial Australia
1980s black comedy films
1985 comedy films
1980s English-language films
1980s Australian films